Dead Man's Island is a 1996 American made-for-television mystery-thriller film starring Barbara Eden, William Shatner and featuring an ensemble cast: Roddy McDowall, Morgan Fairchild, Traci Lords, David Faustino, Christopher Atkins, Olivia Hussey, Jameson Parker, Christopher Cazenove and Don Most. It is based on the 1993 novel of the same name by Carolyn Hart and premiered on CBS on March 5, 1996.

Synopsis
Henrietta O'Dwyer Collins (Barbara Eden), known simply as "Henrie O.", is an investigative journalist called to a mysterious remote island by her old friend Chase Prescott (William Shatner) who fears that someone is trying to kill him and the weekend is filled with intrigue as Henrie O. and all the guests try to figure out who is trying to murder their host.

Cast
Barbara Eden as Henrietta O'Dwyer Collins (Henrie O.)
William Shatner as Chase Prescott
Roddy McDowall as Trevor Dunnaway
Morgan Fairchild as Valerie St. Vincent
Traci Lords as Miranda Prescott
David Faustino as Haskell Prescott
Christopher Atkins as Roger Prescott
Olivia Hussey as Rosie, the housemaid
Jameson Parker as Lyle Stedman 
Don Most as Burton Andrews
Christopher Cazenove as Milo

Home media
Dead Man's Island was released on Region 1 DVD on August 7, 2013 by CBS Home Entertainment.

External links

1996 television films
1996 films
CBS network films
Films based on American novels
Films directed by Peter H. Hunt
American mystery thriller films
American thriller television films
1990s mystery thriller films
1990s English-language films
1990s American films